Chloe Naomi Mustaki (born 29 July 1995) is a footballer who plays as a defender or midfielder for Bristol City of the English Women's Championship. Born in the United States, she is a member of the Republic of Ireland women's national team and also holds French citizenship. At club level she has previously played for Shelbourne, UCD Waves and Peamount United in her home country, as well as for Girondins de Bordeaux in France and Charlton Athletic in England.

Mustaki was the captain of the successful Republic of Ireland women's national under-19 football team which qualified for the UEFA Women's Under-19 Championship finals for the first time in 2014, reaching the semi-finals. She was called up for the senior Republic of Ireland women's national team for the first time in October 2019, winning her first cap in February 2022.

Early life
Mustaki was born in Ohio to an Irish mother and a French father of Greek heritage, who had met at Boston University. They left the United States when Mustaki was one year old. The family then lived in Paris for two years, before Mustaki and her mother moved to Cabinteely upon the separation of Mustaki's parents. Mustaki played street football with her brother and his friends and progressed into organised youth soccer with Park Celtic boys and St. Joseph's.

Club career
For the inaugural 2011–12 season of the Women's National League (WNL), 16-year-old Mustaki joined South Dublin club Peamount United. Seen as a promising midfielder, she helped Peamount secure the league title in her debut season.

Mustaki was one of several Peamount players to follow manager Eileen Gleeson to UCD Waves for 2014–15. In August 2014 Mustaki was diagnosed with Hodgkin lymphoma and underwent chemotherapy. When UCD Waves played in the 2014 FAI Women's Cup final against Raheny United in November, UCD's Áine O'Gorman celebrated her equalising goal by revealing a t-shirt with team-mate Mustaki's squad number 17 on it.

On 16 March 2015 Mustaki played her first football match since July 2014, when she came on as a substitute for UCD Waves against Raheny United at Morton Stadium. 

While based at KEDGE Business School in Bordeaux on an Erasmus Programme placement, Mustaki played for Girondins de Bordeaux. She made 15 appearances in the 2016–17 Division 1 Féminine. After returning to Ireland Mustaki helped UCD Waves finish fourth in the 2017 Women's National League and reach the FAI Women's Cup final, which they lost 1–0 to Cork City at the Aviva Stadium.

Mustaki spent a season with Shelbourne in 2019, then signed for English FA Women's Championship club Charlton Athletic in November 2019. She made her debut in a 1–0 FA Women's League Cup win over London City Lionesses. A serious knee injury sustained on international duty curtailed Mustaki's season in March 2020, just before the COVID-19 pandemic prompted her London-based employer to allow her to work from home in Ireland. She rejoined Shelbourne for 2021. After helping Shelbourne win the 2021 WNL title and playing in the 3–1 2021 FAI Women's Cup Final defeat by Wexford Youths, Mustaki agreed to remain with the club for 2022.

In July 2022 Mustaki returned to English football, signing a one-year professional contract with Women's Championship club Bristol City.

International career

Youth
Mustaki represented Ireland at schoolgirl level while she attended Lycée Français d'Irlande, Clonskeagh. She was named FAI Under-17 Women's International Player of the Year for 2011.

Mustaki was the captain of the Republic of Ireland women's national under-19 football team which qualified for the UEFA Women's Under-19 Championship finals for the first time in 2014. She featured in wins over Spain, England and Sweden as Ireland negotiated the group stage. They lost 4–0 to the Netherlands in the semi-final, for whom Vivianne Miedema scored a hat-trick. Mustaki was substituted after an hour and was frustrated at her conspicuous lack of energy. Shortly after returning home she was diagnosed with Hodgkin lymphoma.

While attached to University College Dublin Mustaki represented Ireland at the 2017 and 2019 Summer Universiades. She had also been selected for the 2015 edition in Gwangju, but withdrew on medical advice due to the 2015 Middle East respiratory syndrome outbreak in South Korea.

Senior
New Republic of Ireland national team coach Vera Pauw called up Mustaki to the senior squad for the first time in October 2019, for the UEFA Women's Euro 2022 qualifier against Ukraine. She retained her squad place and – due to the unavailability of some regular players – was likely to win a debut cap in a March 2020 qualifying match against Greece, but suffered an anterior cruciate ligament injury in training the day before the game. 

Mustaki earned her first cap for Ireland on 19 February 2022 against Russia at the 2022 Pinatar Cup. She made her first competitive appearance on 12 April 2022, playing as a left wing-back in a creditable 1–1 2023 FIFA Women's World Cup qualification – UEFA Group A draw with Sweden at Gamla Ullevi, Gothenburg.

Personal life
Mustaki describes herself as Franco-Irish. She completed ERASMUS Programme placements in Bordeaux and Lisbon while completing her degree in International Commerce and French from University College Dublin (UCD). For her master's degree in International Management she took a placement in London. She then took a job in London with Maven Search in financial services: "I'm mostly headhunting investment bankers over in the States." While injured in 2020 Mustaki worked for Raidió Teilifís Éireann as a television pundit.

References

External links
 
 

1995 births
Living people
Republic of Ireland women's association footballers
Women's association football midfielders
Women's National League (Ireland) players
DLR Waves players
Expatriate women's footballers in France
Alumni of University College Dublin
Charlton Athletic W.F.C. players
Bristol City W.F.C. players
Women's Championship (England) players
Division 1 Féminine players
Shelbourne F.C. (women) players
Peamount United F.C. players
Sportspeople from South Dublin (county)
Association footballers from County Dublin
Irish expatriate sportspeople in England
Irish expatriate sportspeople in France
Irish people of French descent
Irish people of Greek descent
American people of Irish descent
American people of French descent
American people of Greek descent
Expatriate women's footballers in England
FC Girondins de Bordeaux (women) players
Republic of Ireland women's youth international footballers